Captain Ramon Xatruch Airport  was an airport serving La Palma, a port town and the capital of the Darién Province of Panama. The runway is now the main street for the town, with buildings lining both sides.

La Palma is now served by Miraflores Airport,  to the south.

La Palma still hosts the La Palma VOR (Ident: PML) which is atop a hill in the center of the town.

See also
Transport in Panama
List of airports in Panama

References

External links
OpenStreetMap - La Palma
FallingRain - Captain Ramon Xatruch Airport

Defunct airports
Airports in Panama